Karel Verbist (16 August 1883-21 July 1909) was Belgian National Stayers Champion in 1908 and 1909.  

On July 21st, Verbist collided with the motorcycle of Constant Ceurreman (his pacemaker) on the track in Brussels and died almost immediately. Verbist is the subject of a macabre Flemish folk-poem... "Chareltje, Chareltje Verbist, hadt ge niet gereden op de pist(e), hadt ge niet gelegen in de kist." which roughly translates to "Verbist, if you hadn't ridden your bike, you may not have ended up in a coffin."

Achievements
1907 
Germany   1st in Grand World Prize, (Munich (b)), Munich (Bayern), Germany 
Unknown   2nd in World Championship, Track, Stayers, Elite, Paris (Ile-de-France), France 

1908 
Belgium   1st in National Championship, Track, Stayers, Elite, Belgium, Antwerp (Antwerp), Belgium 

1909 
Germany  1st in Breslau, Breslau (Dolnoslaskie), Germany 
Belgium   1st in National Championship, Track, Stayers, Elite, Belgium, Brussels (Brussels-Capital Region), Belgium

See also
List of racing cyclists and pacemakers with a cycling-related death

References

Belgian male cyclists
Belgian track cyclists
1883 births
1909 deaths